The Binghamton Electric was an American automobile manufactured only in 1920. An electric car from Binghamton, New York, the car was made probably as a prototype, by the Binghamton Electric Truck Co., located at 250, Main street. Not more than two or three two-passenger coupes were produced. The company built a small number of electric trucks in 1920–1921.

See also

List of defunct United States automobile manufacturers
History of the electric vehicle

Other Early Electric Vehicles
American Electric 
Argo Electric
Babcock Electric Carriage Company
Berwick
Buffalo Electric
Century
Columbia Automobile Company
Dayton Electric
Detroit Electric
Grinnell
Menominee
Rauch and Lang 
Riker Electric

References
David Burgess Wise, The New Illustrated Encyclopedia of Automobiles.

Electric vehicles introduced in the 20th century
Defunct motor vehicle manufacturers of the United States
Motor vehicle manufacturers based in New York (state)